Peter Alexander Singer, OC, FRSC, is Special Advisor to the Director General of the World Health Organization.

He is also Adjunct Professor of Medicine at University of Toronto.

From 2008-2018 Singer was Chief Executive Officer of Grand Challenges Canada and Director of the Sandra Rotman Centre, University Health Network.

From 1996-2006 Singer was Director of the University of Toronto Joint Centre for Bioethics.

In 2007, Singer received the Michael Smith Prize as Canada's Health Researcher of the Year in Population Health and Health Services. In 2011, Singer was appointed Officer of the Order of Canada for his contributions to health research and bioethics, and for his dedication to improving the health of people in developing countries. He is also a Fellow of the Royal Society of Canada, the Canadian Academy of Health Sciences, the U.S. National Academy of Medicine, and The Academy of Sciences for the Developing World (TWAS). 

Singer was Foreign Secretary of the Canadian Academy of Health Sciences and chaired the Canadian Academy of Health Sciences’ assessment on Canada's Strategic Role in Global Health. He was also Chair of the Every Woman Every Child Innovation Working Group. 

He co-authored, along with Abdallah Daar, The Grandest Challenge: Taking Life-Saving Science from Lab to Village.  

Singer has published over 600 research articles, received over $50 million in research grants, and mentored hundreds of university students. He studied internal medicine at University of Toronto, medical ethics at University of Chicago, public health at Yale University, and management at Harvard Business School. He has served his community as Board Chair of Branksome Hall, an internationally minded school for girls.

References 

Bioethicists
1960 births
Canadian medical researchers
Officers of the Order of Canada
Academic staff of the University of Toronto
University of Toronto alumni
Harvard Business School alumni
Canadian public health doctors
Living people
Yale University alumni
Members of the National Academy of Medicine